Kimarley McDonald (born 2 September 1984) is a Jamaican footballer who last played for Antigua Barracuda FC in the USL Professional Division.

Club career
McDonald played for Boys' Town in his native Jamaica, and for teams in the Middle East and the United States, before signing for TT Pro League club North East Stars in 2010. He played one season for the Trinidadians, scoring 2 goals.

In 2011 McDonald transferred to the new Antigua Barracuda FC team prior to its first season in the USL Professional Division. He made his debut for the Barracudas on 3 June 2011, a 2–1 loss to the Rochester Rhinos.

References

1984 births
Living people
Jamaican footballers
Antigua Barracuda F.C. players
USL Championship players
Expatriate footballers in Trinidad and Tobago
TT Pro League players
Boys' Town F.C. players
Association football defenders